Northstowe Secondary College is a co-educational secondary school and sixth form located in Northstowe in the English county of Cambridgeshire.

The school was established in 2019 as part of the 'Northstowe Education Campus' which is being developed by Cambridgeshire County Council, South Cambridgeshire District Council and Homes England. The campus will also ultimately include a primary school, a special school and a sixth form centre.

Northstowe Secondary College is an academy sponsored by Cambridge Meridian Academies Trust. The school offers GCSEs and BTECs as programmes of study for pupils, and is also expected to ultimately offer a sixth form provision.

References

External links

Academies in Cambridgeshire
Secondary schools in Cambridgeshire
Educational institutions established in 2019
2019 establishments in England